Ture may refer to:

Names
Ture (Zande character), a trickster character from North Central Africa

Personal name
 Ture Hedman (1895–1950), Swedish gymnast
 Ture Malmgren (1851–1922), Swedish journalist and politician
 Ture Nerman (1886–1969), Swedish author and politician
 Ture Persson (1892–1956), Swedish sprinter 
 Ture Rangström (1884–1947), Swedish composer
 Ture Rosvall (1891–1977), Swedish rower
 Ture Zahab (born David HaLevi Segal, c. 1586–1667), Polish rabbinical authority

Family name
 Kwame Ture (1941–1998), American civil rights organizer
 Muhammad Ture (1443–1538), ruler of the Askia Dynasty of the Songhai Empire
 Samori Ture (c. 1830–1900), founder of the Wassoulou Empire
 Seku Ture (1922–1984), president of Guinea

Fictional characters
 Ture Sventon, a fictional detective

Places
 Ture River or Turcu, a tributary of the Jolotca in Romania
 Ture, Drumlane a townland in County Cavan
 Türe, the Hungarian name for Turea village, Gârbău Commune, Cluj County, Romania
 Tureholm Castle, a listed building in Trosa Municipality, Sweden
 Tureholm, Sweden, a locality in Ekerö Municipality

Ture Malmgren

Places named for Ture Malmgren, all located in Uddevalla, Sweden:
 Tureborg Castle, a mock castle built by Malmgren atop Fjällsätern
 Tureborg, a district of Uddevalla
 Ture Valleys, a nature reserve
 Tureholm, an artificial island
 Tomb of Ture Malmgren

See also
 Turing